The Mile Championship Nambu Hai (in Japanese: マイルチャンピオンシップ南部杯), is a Domestic Grade 1 race for three-year-olds and above held at Morioka Racecourse

Race Details
The race was originally known as the "Northern Japan Mile Championship", until it switched to the current name in 1995. 

The race took place at Mizusawa Racecourse from 1988 to 1994 and due to earthquakes, took place at Tokyo Racecourse in 2011.

The race is always held in October.

Winners since 2014

Past winners

Past winners include:

See also
 Horse racing in Japan
 List of Japanese flat horse races

References

Horse races in Japan
Recurring sporting events established in 1988
Dirt races in Japan